Mario Donadoni (born 19 November 1979) is an Italian retired footballer who played as a defender.

Career
In 2009, he was transferred by the Italian Lega Pro Prima Divisione team U.S. Siracusa for which he played 9 games until 2010. In July 2010 Mario Donadoni was transferred by the Romanian Liga I team FCM Târgu Mureş as a free agent.

References

External links

1979 births
Living people
Italian footballers
Liga I players
Expatriate footballers in Romania
ASA 2013 Târgu Mureș players
Association football defenders